OMS Arena, is a multi-purpose stadium in Senica, Slovakia.  It is mainly used mostly for football matches and hosts the home matches of FK Senica of the Slovak Superliga.  The stadium has a capacity of 5,070 spectators. The intensity of the floodlighting is 1,545 lux.

External links
Stadium Database Article
Football stadiums profile

References

Football venues in Slovakia
Multi-purpose stadiums in Slovakia
FK Senica
Senica
Buildings and structures in Trnava Region
Sports venues completed in 1962
1962 establishments in Slovakia